The Women's 4x200m Freestyle Relay at the 2009 World Aquatics Championships took place on July 30, 2009 at the Foro Italico in Rome, Italy.

Records

The existing records when the event started were:

The following records were established during the competition:

Results

Heats

Final

External links
Preliminary Results
Final Results

Relay Women's Freestyle 4x200 m
2009 in women's swimming